United Nations Security Council Resolution 77, adopted on 11 October 1949, having received and examined the second progress report of the Commission for Conventional Armaments, the Council directed the Secretary-General to transmit the report, along with its annexes, accompanying resolution and a record of the Council’s consideration of the subject to the General Assembly for its information.

The resolution was adopted with nine votes in favour and two abstentions from the Ukrainian SSR and Soviet Union.

See also
United Nations Security Council Resolution 18
United Nations Security Council Resolution 78
List of United Nations Security Council Resolutions 1 to 100 (1946–1953)

References
Text of the Resolution at undocs.org

External links
 

 0077
Arms control
October 1949 events